Knakal is a surname. Notable people with the surname include:

Martin Knakal (born 1984), Czech footballer
Petr Knakal (born 1983), Czech footballer